The 2019 Zhuhai Open was a professional tennis tournament played on hard courts. It was the fourth edition of the tournament and part of the 2019 ATP Challenger Tour. It took place in Zhuhai, China between 4 and 10 March 2019.

Singles main-draw entrants

Seeds

 1 Rankings are as of 25 February 2019.

Other entrants
The following players received wildcards into the singles main draw:
  Gao Xin
  He Yecong
  Hua Runhao
  Xia Zihao
  Zhang Zhizhen

The following players received entry into the singles main draw using their ITF World Tennis Ranking:
  Javier Barranco Cosano
  Raúl Brancaccio
  Baptiste Crepatte
  Karim-Mohamed Maamoun

The following players received entry from the qualifying draw:
  Bai Yan
  Harri Heliövaara

Champions

Singles

 Enrique López Pérez def.  Evgeny Karlovskiy 6–1, 6–4.

Doubles

 Gong Maoxin /  Zhang Ze def.  Max Purcell /  Luke Saville 6–4, 6–4.

References

 
2019 ATP Challenger Tour
2019 in Chinese tennis
2019
March 2019 sports events in China